Ihor Pavlyuk (sometimes spelled as Ihor Pawlyuk, Igor Pavlyk, Igor Pavluk; Ukrainian: І́гор Зино́війович Павлю́к, Russian: Игорь Зиновьевич Павлюк, born 1 January 1967 in Rozhysche Raion, Ukrainian SSR) is a Ukrainian writer, translator and research worker. Named People's Poet of Ukraine in 2020.

He is the winner of a 2013 English PEN Award, and the winner of the Switzerland Literary Prize 2021.
He also holds a doctorate in Social Communication.

Ihor Pavlyuk is a member of the English PEN and member of the European Society of Authors.

Life and career
Ihor Pavlyuk was born in the Volyn region on January 1, 1967. His mother died ten days after giving birth to him. He was raised by his grandfather and grandmother on his mother's side, both of whom were migrant peasants (Operation Vistula) from the Helm region (now Poland). Ihor Pavlyuk's family on his father's side, also from Volyn, was repressed for participating in the national liberation struggle, sent to a special settlement at Kiselyovsk in 1947 and rehabilitated in 1991.

He studied at the Saint Petersburg military engineering-technical university, which he left in order to pursue his career as a writer. As a result he was sentenced to a period of hard labour in the Taiga (Zabaykal'skiy region) but continued to write as best he could, driven by a nostalgia for his Ukrainian homeland, until he was freed when the Soviet Union fell.
In 1992 Ihor Pavlyuk graduated from the Department of Journalism at Lviv University (he included in the list of the "100 Notable alumni of Ivan Franko National University of Lviv") and worked as a correspondent of religious press and radio in Lviv.

He has participated in various international literary festivals, including Estonia, Georgia, Russia, Belarus, Germany, Italy, the United States, Poland, Turkey, Ireland, Pakistan, England, Czech Republic, Switzerland, Austria.

Ihor Pavlyuk is presently a Leading Researcher at the Taras Shevchenko Institute of Literature of the National Academy of Sciences of Ukraine in Kyiv, Professor of Ukrainian media at the Ivan Franko National University of Lviv,a member of the editorial boards of literary, art and scientific magazines: "Золота пектораль", "Дзвін", "Українська літературна газета", "Вісник Львівського університету".

Works of Ihor Pavlyuk have been translated into Russian, Belarusian, Polish, English, French, Chinese, Latvian, Bulgarian, Japanese, Italian, and other languages and published in such magazines as "Acumen", "The Apple Valley Review" (Volume 7, Number 2 (Fall 2012), "Muddy River Poetry Review", "Asymptote", "Gold Dust" (Issue 23), "The Adirondack Review", "The Recusant", "Metamorphoses", "Eurasia Review", "The world poets quarterly", "The Guardian","Critical Muslim" (2022), Chinese magazines "Fleurs des lettres", «Foreign literature and art (外國文學藝術)» and many others.

Ihor Pavlyuk is the protagonist of the film "Between Bug and God" and film "Voice".

The work of Ihor Pavlyuk is included in the official school curriculum with Ukrainian literature.

The book of Ihor Pavlyuk "A Flight over the Black Sea" became the winning book within Writers in Translation competition by English PEN club. Academia.edu has included book "A Flight over the Black Sea" in the authoritative list “The Greatest Great Books List Ever”.

Ihor Pavlyuk is married. His wife Lyudmyla Pavlyuk is Associate Professor at Department of Journalism of Lviv University.

Selected publications (books)

Poetry 
 Islands of youth (Острови юності), 1990, 
 Not this of place wind (Нетутешній вітер), 1993, 
 Voice of daily Moon (Голос денного Місяця), 1994, 
 Glass tavern (Скляна корчма), 1995,  
 Allergy to eternity (Babylonia) (Алергія на вічність), 1999,  
 Disaster (Стихія), 2002, 
 Masculine fortunetelling (Чоловіче ворожіння), 2002,  
 The angel (or) English language? (poems by Ihor Pavlyuk in English), 2004, 
 Magma (Магма), 2005, 
 Rebellion (Бунт), 2006, 
 The Tuning Fork (Камертон), 2007,  
 Lyrics (Лірика), 2008, 
 Ukraine at smoke (Україна в диму), 2009,  
 Stratosphere (Стратосфера), 2010, 
 Catching Gossamers (New York City) (Ловлячи осінні павутинки, Ловя осенние паутинки), 2011, 
 Confessions of the last sorcerer (Saint Petersburg) (Исповедь последнего волхва, Сповідь останнього волхва) (poems by Ihor Pavlyuk in Russian), 2012, 
 Masculine fortunetelling (Lublin) (Męskie wróżby (poems by Ihor Pavlyuk in Polish. Translator Tadej Karabovich), 2013, 
 Teamster (Kyiv), (Погонич), 2014, Погонщик (poems by modern Russian poet Yevgeny Chigrin in Ukrainian. Translator Ihor Pavlyuk. Forewords by Yevgeny Rein, Ihor Pavlyuk), 
 A Flight over the Black Sea (London, Waterloo Press), (Політ над Чорним морем), 2014 (poems by Ihor Pavlyuk in English. Translated from Ukrainian by Stephen Komarnyckyj, foreword to a book written recipient of the Nobel Prize for Literature Mo Yan and Naomi Foyle, Steve Komarnyckyj, Dmytro Drozdovskyi),  
 Game and Battle (Гра і битва), 2014, 
 Magma of Polissya (Magma polésien: poèmes / Traduction française par Dmytro Tchystiak et Athanase Vantchev de Thracy. Rouen, Christophe Chmomant éditeur, 2015.). (The book of poetry in French, Rouen), 
 The Pilgrim: A verse novel (Паломник: Роман-медитація у віршах), 2018. 
 Crack (Kyiv) (Трещина, Тріщина) (poems by Ihor Pavlyuk in Russian), 2019, 
 Salt (English Edition): Selected Poems (New York, 2019) (Сіль) (poems by Ihor Pavlyuk in English), 
 Carrier of dreams (Перевізник мрій), 2019, 
 Black flax (Чорний льон), 2019, 
 Arthania: Selected Poems (United States, Dorrance Publishing Company), (Arthania), 2020 (poems by Ihor Pavlyuk in English. Translated from Ukrainian by Yurii Lazirko, editors: Hilary Sheers, Hanna Kosiv.Foreword to a book written recipient of the Nobel Prize for Literature Mo Yan, 
 Spas (The Saviour): a book of spiritual lyrics (Спас: книга духовної лірики), 2021,

Prose 
 Biography of the tree of tribe of poets (Біографія дерева племені поетів), 2003,  
 Forbidden Bloom (Заборонений цвіт), 2007, 
 Out of Range (Поза зоною), 2012, 
 Growing diamonds (Вирощування алмазів), 2016, 
 Mesozoic (Мезозой), 2018, 
 The Bug (Буг), 2020, 
 Vacuum (Вакуум), 2022,

Monographs 
 Writer – Power – Press: historical and typological analysis (Митець – Влада – Преса: історико-типологічний аналіз), 1997, 
 Diagnostics and prognosis of lie: digressions in the theory of communication (Діагностика і прогностика брехні: екскурси в теорію комунікації), 2003, 
 There are writers in a press (Письменники у пресі), 2010, 
 Intimate breath of the era. Articles, reviews, interviews (1994-2010). — Volume 1. (Library of the magazine "Golden Pectoral") (Інтимне дихання епохи. Статті, рецензії, інтерв'ю (1994—2010 рр.). — Том 1.), 2017, .
 Intimate breath of the era. Articles, reviews, interviews (2010—2015). — Volume 2. (Library of the magazine "Golden Pectoral") (Інтимне дихання епохи. Статті, рецензії, інтерв'ю (2010—2015 рр.). — Том 2.), 2017, .
 Intimate breath of the era. Articles, reviews, interviews (1997—2017). — Volume 3. (Library of the magazine "Golden Pectoral") (Інтимне дихання епохи. Статті, рецензії, інтерв'ю (1997—2017 рр.). — Том 3.), 2017, .
 Ukrainian literary journalism 1920-2000 s: Monograph (Українська письменницька публіцистика 1920-2000-х років: Монографія) 2019, .
 Stories of emotions: About texts and life texts of modern writers (Історії емоцій: Про тексти та життєтексти сучасних літераторів. – Львів, Світ, 2021. – 352 с.)  .
 Intimate breath of the era. Articles, interviews (2018—2021). — Volume 4. (Library of the magazine "Golden Pectoral") (Інтимне дихання епохи. Статті, інтерв'ю (2018—2021 рр.). — Том 4.), 2022, .

Book for children 
 The Flying Cauldron (Літаючий казан), 2003, 
 Flute: Poems for Schoolchildren ("School Library") (Сопілка: вірші для школярів) («Шкільна бібліотека»), 2017, .

Awards

 People's Taras Shevchenko Prize
 Hryhorii Skovoroda prize
 International Nikolai Gogol literary prize "Triumph"
 Winner of a 2013 English PEN Award
 Winner of the Switzerland Literary Prize 2021

See also
 Ukrainian literature
 Contemporary Ukrainian literature

References

External links 
 
 Google Академія‬ — Google Scholar 
 100 Notable alumni of Ivan Franko National University of Lviv
 #MINTFORUKRAINE
 Mo Yan. Ihor Pavlyuk's literature is not just for fun (Preface to the book «Arthania: Selected Poems» (United States, Dorrance Publishing Company, 2020)
 "Little Girl", translated by Thomas Moore (Dublin, Ireland)
 Naomi Foyle. Ihor Pavlyuk: The Beginning of Our Country
 Zuzanna Zajkowska. A Journey Through the Literature of Ukraine: From a pet penguin to a slice of cherry pie
 Trailer of the movie "Ihor Pavlyuk. Between Bug and God"_1
 Trailer of the movie "Ihor Pavlyuk. Between Bug and God"_2
 Thom Moore (Ireland, Dublin). The Temptation of Accessibility: Ihor Pavlyuk, Poetry, and Language as a Post-Imperial Statement
 Speech of Ukrainian poet Ihor Pavlyuk (International Punjabi Congress, Pakistan, December 28, 2013)
 An interview with... Ihor Pavlyuk and Steve Komarnyckyj
 PEN Atlas Q&A: Ihor Pavlyuk and Steve Komarnyckyj
 Poetry With A Strong Imagination – Review, By Acad. Dr. Jeton Kelmendi, Brussels
 Ihor Pavlyuk, Ukraine. Poems
 American actors read poems by Ihor Pavlyuk
  Ian Widdop. LitLetter 157: The People's Poet of Ukraine

Living people
Ukrainian journalists
Ukrainian poets
Ukrainian writers
Ukrainian novelists
Ukrainian translators
Translators from Russian
Translators from Belarusian
1967 births
People from Volyn Oblast
20th-century Ukrainian poets
Translators from English
Translators to Ukrainian
21st-century translators
21st-century Ukrainian poets
Ukrainian male poets
Ukrainian male writers
20th-century male writers
21st-century male writers